The Stenka class is the NATO reporting name for a class of patrol boats built for the Soviet Navy and Soviet Allies. The Soviet designation was Project 205P Tarantul (not to be confused with the ).

Design
Project 205P Stenka is a variant of the Project 205 Osa-class missile boat. The Stenka used the hull of the Osa class and had a slightly larger crew. The development office of the Almaz Shipyard in Leningrad used the standardized components of the Osa missile patrol boat, in order to develop an ASW boat. The anti-ship missile launch containers were replaced by four torpedo tubes but the anti-ship missile related structures and equipment were retained. The living spaces in the Stenka were improved for long patrol endurance by raising the superstructure in order to create more usable space inside, compared to the Project 205 Osa missile boat. They also installed a more powerful air conditioner.

Armament

The primary ASW weapon for combating submarines were SET-40 torpedoes. The boats have four  torpedo tubes installed on the deck in the aft part of the boats, two on the port side and two on starboard side.

Behind the torpedo tubes on the aft deck, in the port and starboard sides, are each one Abrollgestell depth charge launcher.  Twelve depth charges, six for each launcher can be carried.

As the boats of the Project 205 Osa class, the Project 205P Stenka boats has two radar-controlled AK-230 30 mm gun in twin mounts, one in the bow, the other at the rear.

One of the boats was tested with an AK-725 57 mm gun on the bow and received a modified project number - 205PE.

Sensors

The 205P project air and surface search radar is a NATO "Pot Drum" MR-102 or a NATO "Peel Cone" "positive" - Radar installed on the mast, with two antennae for the NATO "High Pole B" friend or foe identification system. The NATO "Drum Tilt" type MR-104 radar is mounted on the rear of the superstructure For directing the fire of the two AK-230 guns. The ships have an MG-345 "Bronza" submarine search system fitted, consisting of a submersible Project 133.1 MG-329 "Sheksna" sonar with an MG-11 "Tamir-11" sonar sensor built into the fuselage.

Ships

Soviet Navy
A total of 114 or 117 (sources vary) boats were built between 1967 and 1990. They were operated by the Maritime Border Guard

The Soviet Union classified the boats of their border troops as "border guard ships" (Russian Пограничные сторожевые корабли (ПСКР)) and the five boats in the Navy as gunboats (Russian артиллерийский катер). A similar allocation of boats for submarine patrol are assigned into the border guards, which is rather unusual in NATO countries, and so the Project 205P patrol boat identification is used.

 Russian Navy – About 19 survivors are operated by the Russian Coast Guard
 Azerbaijan Navy – 5 boats
 Ukrainian Navy – 10? boats (may be operated by the Ukrainian Sea Guard)
 Georgian Navy – 2 boats (1 – "Batumi" was scrapped in 2006, another - Giorgi Toreli sunk in the Battle off the coast of Abkhazia)

Export

 Cuban Navy – 4 boats exported in 1985
 Cambodia – 5 boats transferred 1985–1987. Rearmed with twin 40mm Bofors L/60 guns forward and ZU-23-2 aft, replacing the AK-230 turrets. Torpedo tubes removed.

See also
 List of ships of the Soviet Navy
 List of ships of Russia by project number

References

Notes

Bibliography
  Also published as 
 Юрий В. Апальков: Корабли ВМФ СССР. Том II. Ударные корабли. Часть II. Малые ракетные корабли и катера. (etwa: Juri W. Apalkow: Schiffe der Sowjetischen Marine. – Teil II „U-Jagd-Schiffe“ Abschnitt 2 „Kleine-Raketen-Schiffe und Boote“. Galea Print, 2004, . 
 Jane's Fighting Ships 2004–2005. Jane's Information Group, .
 Conway's All the World's Fighting Ships Naval Institute. Press Annapolis, Maryland 1947–1995.
 Norman Friedman: The Naval Institute guide to world naval weapon systems. US Naval Institute Press, 1997, .

External links
 Maritime Units of the Russian Border Guard Forces
 Project 205P Patrol Boats 
 Complete Ship List of all Stenka class patrol boats

Patrol vessels of the Soviet Navy
Patrol boat classes
Patrol vessels of Russia